The Yarluyandi, also known as Jeljendi, are an Aboriginal Australian people of north-eastern South Australia.

Country
Their western confines were in the vicinity of Atna Hill, while their eastern extension went as far as Birdsville and the Diamantina River.

Native title
The Yarluyandi now form an aggregate with the Wangkangurru people, and are represented by the Wangkangurru Yarluyandi Aboriginal Corporation. Their native title over a large area of the Simpson Desert was recognised in 2014.

Language
The Yarluyandi language was closely related to the Ngamini language.

Alternative names
 Jeljujendi
 Yelyuyendi
 Yarleeyandee.

Notes

Citations

Sources

Aboriginal peoples of South Australia